Mike Faber may refer to:

 Mike Faber (In Plain Sight), a character from the TV series In Plain Sight
 Mike Faber (Homeland), a character from the TV series Homeland

See also
Michael Faber (disambiguation)